This is an incomplete list of works by Paul Klee (18 December 1879 – 29 June 1940), a Swiss-born German artist and draftsman. His highly individual style was influenced by movements in art that included Expressionism, Cubism, and Surrealism.

List of paintings

See also
 Ab ovo (1917)
 Swamp Legend (1919)
 Villa R (1919)
 Angelus Novus (1920)
 Camel (in rhythmic landscape with trees) (1920)
 Senecio (1922)
 Twittering Machine (1922)
 Architecture (1923)
 Fish Magic (1925)
 Limits of Reason (1927)
 Cat and Bird (1928)
 Highway and Byways (1929)
 Has Head, Hand, Feet and Heart (1930)
 Ad Parnassum (1932)
 In the Magic Mirror (1934)
 Insula dulcamara (1938)
 Angel, Still Groping (1939)
 Death and Fire (1940)

List of other works
 A Man Sinks Down Before the Crown, (1904), Chicago Art Institute
 A Phantom Crumbles, (1927), Chicago Art Institute
 
 
 An Angel Brings what is Desired, (1920), Chicago Art Institute
 Architecture, (1921), Chicago Art Institute
 Artistic Comedy, (1932), Chicago Art Institute
 
 Blooming Plant, (1931), Chicago Art Institute
 Castle and Sun, (1928), Private collection
 
 Dancing Girl, (1940), Chicago Art Institute
 Departure of the Ghost, (1931).
 Dream City, (1921), Private collection
 Duke Leader Ladder, Not Alone, (1938), Chicago Art Institute
 Festival of the Lanterns, Bauhaus, (1922), Chicago Art Institute
 Fun on the Inland Lake, (1932), Chicago Art Institute
 
 Great Harbor, (1932), Chicago Art Institute
 Height, (1928), Chicago Art Institute
 
 Hoffmannesque Fairy-Tale Scene, (1921), Chicago Art Institute
 
 
 
 
 Mosaic-Like, (1932), Chicago Art Institute
 
 
 Singed Garden, (1924), Chicago Art Institute
 
 Starving Spirits, (1934), Chicago Art Institute
 The Sublime Aspect, (1923), Chicago Art Institute
 
 
 Two Men Meet, each Believing the Other to be of Higher Rank, (1903), Chicago Art Institute
 Untitled, (1918), Chicago Art Institute
 Virgin Dreaming, (1903), Chicago Art Institute

Notes and references

External links

Paul Klee
.Klee
Klee
Modern paintings
Works by artist